No. 268 Squadron RAF was a Second World War Royal Air Force squadron that operated the North American Mustang on missions over occupied Europe and in support of the D-Day landings.

History

First World War

No.268 Squadron Royal Air Force was originally formed at Kalafrana, Malta in August 1918 as an Anti Submarine Warfare patrol unit flying Sopwith Baby, Shorts 184 and 320 float planes and Felixstowe F.3 flying boats.  The squadron parented in October 1918, 433 and 434 (Seaplane) Flights, which were also based at Kalafrana and used Short 184 seaplanes.  After a short period of service as independent entities, these two flights were absorbed back into No.268 Squadron in March 1919.  The squadron patrolled the Mediterranean surrounding Malta and had only one recorded combat action, an unsuccessful attack on a U-Boat on 14 November 1918.  It was disbanded on 11 October 1919.  The Squadron Commanding Officer Officer was Major A M Cave.

Second World War
The squadron number was reactivated in April 1939, but no action was taken to reform the squadron until late in 1940.  No. 268 Squadron was reformed at Westley Aerodrome near Bury St Edmunds in England on 30 September 1940 as an Army Co-operation Command squadron, flying Westland Lysander Mk.II, de Havilland Tiger Moth and Miles Magister aircraft.  The squadron was formed by merging ‘A’ Flight of No. II(AC) Squadron RAF with ‘B’ Flight of No. 26 Squadron RAF.  The first Commanding Officer of the reformed squadron was Squadron Leader P. De G H Seymour, soon after promoted to the rank of wing commander. The initial task for the squadron was the conduct of anti-invasion patrols along the coast of Southern England, and reconnaissance of potential invasion sites within the UK. The squadron also had a secondary role in providing elementary pilot training for enlisted Army personnel who had been selected for training as glider pilots.

In May 1941, then under the command of Wing Commander A F Anderson DFC, the squadron started to re-equip with Curtiss P-40 Tomahawk aircraft, although it did retain a number of Westland Lysander aircraft for some months after re-equipment commenced. During this time, the squadron re-located to RAF Snailwell in Cambridgeshire.  After being declared operational on the new aircraft, the squadron commenced support for Army training exercises and undertook shipping patrols in the English Channel and North Sea, primarily along the coast of northern France, Belgium and the Netherlands.  This was combined with an ongoing training programme for both aircrew and ground crew of the squadron.

In April 1942 the Squadron commenced re-equipment again, this time to the North American Mustang Mk.I aircraft.  A limited number of Curtiss P-40 Tomahawks were retained until mid-1943 for non-operational use as they were fitted with either vertical or oblique reconnaissance cameras, and until the newly arrived Mustangs were similarly fitted, the Tomahawks were used for training and in exercises where reconnaissance photography was required.  On 15 June 1942, a number of pilots and the majority of the remaining Curtiss Tomahawk aircraft still with the squadron were transferred from the squadron to form the cadre of the newly formed No. 168 Squadron RAF.  

No. 268 Squadron was declared operational with the Mustang Mk.I in June 1942, and commenced a range of reconnaissance and intruder operations, again primarily along the coast of northern France, Belgium and the Netherlands.  The squadron suffered a number of operational casualties either as the result of direct enemy action or aircraft mechanical failure as they commenced to range more frequently into enemy controlled areas.  The pace of squadron operations grew in the later half of 1942, including close escort to bombing raids.

On 21 October 1942, whilst on a mission to the Dortmund-Ems Canal and other objectives in Holland flown by aircraft of No. 268 Squadron, the Mustang Mk.I became the first single-engined fighter based in the UK to penetrate the German border.  The mission was conducted by four aircraft and led by Wing Commander A F Anderson, with Flt Lt B P W Clapin, Plt Off O R Chapman RNZAF, and Flg Off W T Hawkins RNZAF.  This mission caused a great deal of consternation to the German High Command, as the presence of single engined RAF fighters operating from the UK over Germany meant that a new level of threat had to be considered.  On 26 November 1942, during an operation over Holland, Flg Off R A Bethell, spotted and shot down a Luftwaffe Messerschmitt Bf-109 and shortly after sighted a Junkers Ju.52 transport aircraft which he also promptly shot down in flames (post-War analysis indicates these were in fact a Klemm trainer and a Junkers W-34 target tug).  These were the squadron's first recorded air to air combat victories.  On 13 December 1942, two aircraft of 268 Squadron flew to Wittmund-Jade Canal, Christen Canal and Dortmund-Ems Canal and shot up targets of opportunity, including trucks, barges, tugs and a searchlight.  In this timeframe the squadron, especially the squadron engineering staff, were very active in developing and proving a number of oblique and vertical reconnaissance photography mounts and controls for the Mustang aircraft.

In early 1943, operations continued over enemy occupied territory, especially over the Netherlands, with resulting losses to squadron personnel and aircraft, but not without exacting their own toll on the enemy.  In early March 1943, the squadron at that time under the command of Wing Commander P A Dudgeon DFC, participated as a part of “X” Mobile Composite Group, representing the “enemy forces” in Exercise Spartan.  In May and June 1943 the Squadron was operating in southern England, conducting morning and evening patrols at low level to prevent low flying enemy ‘hit and run raiders’ and reconnaissance aircraft from crossing over the English coast.  

In July 1943 the Squadron, then under the command of Sqn Ldr G Pallot, commenced re-equipment again, this time to the North American Mustang Mk.IA aircraft.  The primary differences between this version and the earlier Mk.I was in armament with a change to four 20mm cannon and a later specification, more powerful, engine.  The squadron also had from early to late 1943 at times variously one or two Hawker Typhoon Mk.I early ‘car door’ variant aircraft which were used for pilot familiarisation flying and dis-similar air combat practise flying.

Into the second half of 1943 the hectic pace of operations continued, with the squadron taking a very active role in Operation Starkey during the period 27 August to 9 September 1943.  In November 1943 the squadron pulled back from the main area of operations in southern England to RAF Turnhouse outside Edinburgh, Scotland, exchanging its aircraft with those of No. 63 Squadron RAF, to conduct a period of rebuilding and training in preparation for the forthcoming invasion of occupied Europe in 1944.  It was in this timeframe that the squadron became a part of 35 (Reconnaissance) Wing of 2nd Tactical Air Force.

The squadron moved south again in early 1944, then under the command of Squadron Leader A S Mann DFC, regaining its North American Mustang Mk.IA aircraft and initially being based at North Weald.  Operational activity at this time was largely focussed on reconnaissance against the German V1 flying bombs sites then starting to appear in France and aircraft from the squadron were responsible for obtaining some of the first, clear, low level photography of V1 launching sites in France.  Activity continued into early 1944 with an air to air gunnery course in Wales during February and a move to RAF Sawbridgeworth at the beginning of March 1944. The squadron then attended a naval gunfire direction course at Dundonald in Scotland in late March to early April.  The squadron then moved to RAF Gatwick and commenced intensive reconnaissance operations in preparation for the invasion.  Many sorties were conducted at extremely low level against a range of targets, including enemy coastal defence positions, lines of communication, major enemy supply centres, radar sites and enemy airfields.  Again losses were incurred, but the squadron was also scoring against the enemy.  In the period immediately before D-Day, aircraft from the Squadron conducted special last minute sorties to check on the state of German defensive preparations in the immediate area of the planned invasion.

For D-Day, 6 June 1944, the squadron initially operated providing naval gunnery spotting and direction for units of the Home Fleet bombarding enemy defences operating out of RNAS Lee-on-Solent, and then later in the day switched to tactical reconnaissance searching out enemy reinforcements and units in the area behind the beachhead, with sorties late in the evening as far east as the western outskirts of Paris. The squadron suffered one recorded loss on D-Day, a pilot who was returning to base with aircraft engine problems went missing over the Channel. The tactical reconnaissance role in support of the invading Allied armies, and primarily the First Canadian Army, was to continue as the main role for the squadron for the remainder of the war.

In July 1944 the squadron started to re-equip with another aircraft type, this time the Hawker Typhoon FR.Ib, a variant of the Hawker Typhoon fighter bomber and ground attack aircraft.  The Typhoon was a different ‘beast’ to the squadron's beloved Mustangs, and met a mixed reception.  Given the shorter operational range of the Typhoon compared to the Mustang and generally inferior quality of the reconnaissance photography from the Typhoon brought about by the transmission of engine vibrations to the airframe, the Typhoon FR.Ib only ever equipped one flight of the squadron, the other two flights continuing to operate Mustang Mk.IA aircraft.  The Typhoon eventually proved not to be suitable for the tactical reconnaissance role, and they were retired from the squadron by the end of November 1944 to be replaced by more Mustangs, this time the North American Mustang Mk.II.

In early August 1944 the squadron moved to the continent and then commenced a period of high mobility moving behind the advancing Allied armies and sustained activity providing reconnaissance coverage of the ever changing frontline and enemy rear areas.  The squadron was heavily involved in reconnaissance sorties covering the German retreat from France, including the Falaise Gap, retreat over the Seine, and pursuit of the Germans through Belgium and the Netherlands.  Again losses were suffered, but during this period, they tended to be more from flak rather than enemy fighter opposition.  In this timeframe the Squadron was also tasked with a number of sorties to search for possible German V2 rocket launching sites in Belgium and the Netherlands.

From August 1944 the squadron was based in turn at Beny-Sur-Mer - France, Plumetot - France, Boisney – France, Fresnoy-Folny – France, St. Omer/Fort Rouge – France, St. Denijs Westrem/Ghent – Belgium, Deurne/Antwerp – Belgium.  In some instances the Squadron only remained at the airfield for a matter of days before moving on again to follow the Allied ground advances.  At Deurne/Antwerp in October 1944 the Squadron was honoured, along with the other units in 35 (Recce) Wing, to be visited and inspected by His Majesty King George VI, accompanied by Field Marshal Montgomery, General Dempsey (C-in-C 2nd British Army), General Crerar (C-in-C First Canadian Army), Air Marshal Conningham (C-in-C 2TAF), Air Vice Marshal Brown (OC 84 Group, 2 TAF) and various Aide-de-Camps. Shortly afterwards the Squadron was also inspected by the Chief of the Air Staff of the Royal Air Force, Marshal of the RAF Sir Charles Portal.

By 1 January 1945 the Squadron was located at Gilze Rijen in the Netherlands, and scored one of its last confirmed air to air combat victories against German aircraft taking part in the massed air raid on Allied airfields that day - Flt Lt J Lyke damaged and possibly shot down a Focke-Wulf FW-190A, and Flt Lt A Mercer shot down a Junkers JU-88-G6 which crashed near Utrecht, which was one of the last recorded air-to-air kills by an Allison engined Mustang in World War II.  The last recorded air to air combat kill scored by an aircraft of the Squadron was that of a Focke-Wulf FW-190 shot down by Flt Lt S J Perkins RAFVR flying Mustang Mk.II FR896, near Kreffeld on 28 February 1945.  February 1945 also saw the Squadron's last recorded casualty for the War, being Flt Lt F R Normoyle RAAF, shot down and killed by enemy anti-aircraft fire near Borcholt on 8 February 1945.

In April 1945 the squadron at that time under the command of Squadron Leader C.T. P Stephenson DFC, moved from Mill to Twenthe and commenced re-equipment with the Supermarine Spitfire FR.XIVE, a dedicated reconnaissance version of the Rolls-Royce Griffon engined variant of the Spitfire, which was used alongside the remaining Mustangs, at that stage a mix of a limited number of Mustang Mk.IA and larger number of Mustang Mk.II aircraft.  The squadron used these up to and after VE Day in May 1945.  After VE-Day the squadron continued on as a part of the occupying Allied forces and moved to Celle in late May 1945.  In August 1945 the squadron retired the last of its Allison engined North American Mustangs thus ending forty months relationship with the Mustang. In mid-September 1945 the squadron took on an additional aircraft type, being the purpose-built high-altitude reconnaissance Supermarine Spitfire PR.XIX, these aircraft being largely acquired by the transfer of a flight from No. 16 Squadron.

On 19 September 1945, as a part of the general restructuring of the post-war RAF and repatriation home of Commonwealth aircrew, the squadron was disbanded at Celle in Germany and reformed/renumbered as No. 16 Squadron RAF. The squadron's final commanding officer in the tactical reconnaissance role was Squadron Leader C T P Stephenson DFC & Bar. The newly renumbered No.16 Squadron would continue in the tactical/fighter reconnaissance role until 1 April 1946,at that time under the command of a former member of No.268 Squadron, Squadron Leader E.J. Milne DFC RAFVR. It was disbanded on the transfer of the Squadron from British Air Forces of Occupation to Fighter Command on 1 April 1946 and No.56 Squadron RAF which was equipped with the Hawker Tempest Mk.V was renumbered at No.16 Squadron RAF. 

On the same day, 19 September 1945, No. 487 Squadron RNZAF under the command of Wing Commander W P Kemp DSO DFC, was disbanded and reformed/ renumbered also as No. 16 Squadron RNZAF. This confusion did lead to a period where the aircraft of the newly renumbered No. 16 Squadron flying Supermarine Spitfires and the newly renumbered No. 268 Squadron both carried the same EG squadron identification letters on their aircraft.  The administrative error of two squadrons both being renumbered as No. 16 Squadron was soon corrected and on 1 October 1945, No. 487 Squadron officially became No. 268 Squadron, as a light bomber squadron operating the de Havilland Mosquito FB.VI.  In early 1946 a number of the squadron's aircrew and aircraft were detached to form part of the Nuremberg Courier Flight supporting the Nuremberg War Trials, as well as participated in a recreation of the attack on the Amiens Prison ‘Operation Jericho’ that occurred in 1944 for the filming of a documentary film on that event.  The squadron was finally disbanded on 30 March 1946, when based at A 75 Cambrai/Epinoy, with a detachment at B 56 Evere/Brussels (which had commenced in December 1945).

During its wartime existence from September 1940 to May 1945, the squadron included aircrew from the United Kingdom (England, Northern Ireland, Scotland, Wales), Australia, British West Indies, Canada, India, New Zealand, Poland and United States of America.  The squadron suffered twenty-eight casualties during the War, twenty-one aircrew killed due to enemy action or whilst on operations and seven killed in accidents during training.  Five pilots were shot down during operations and made Prisoners of War.

Badge
In November 1941, the squadron was granted its squadron badge and motto, the badge being a swallow soaring holding a tomahawk in its claws – the swallow representing reconnaissance at all levels and the tomahawk equating to the aircraft type in service with the squadron at that time – the motto of Adjidaumo ‘Tail in Air’ – drawn from the Chippewa, a dialectal form of the Ojibwe Native American language and as in Wordsworth's ‘Song of Hiawatha’.

Aircraft operated

Notable squadron members
Ken Wallis

References

Bibliography

External links

268